Amount to Nothing is the debut album from the band Yakuza. It was self-released in 2001.

Track listing
"Vessel (On)" – 1:39
"Sweetest Day" – 2:35
"Copremisis" – 3:07
"Turkish Goggles" – 6:02
"Signal" – 2:13
"Ender" – 5:23
"The Stranger" – 3:14
"Angry Dragon" – 3:07
"Vessel (Off)" – 7:06

2001 debut albums
Yakuza (band) albums
Self-released albums